Michael Robin Parrish (born October 13, 1975) is an American author and journalist. His various credits in the field of journalism, include senior editing positions for Christian Music related websites About Christian Music, CMCentral.com, and writing credits among the likes of Christian Musician Magazine, CCM Magazine, and others. In January 2004, Parrish created the website Infuze Magazine, which claimed to be a unique mixture of the concepts Art and Faith. In 2008, he co-created PopCultureGeek.com, a website devoted to fandom and all the things pop culture fans are most passionate about.

Biography
Robin Parrish was born in Thomasville, North Carolina, to Michael Wayland Parrish and Lutricia Jones Parrish. His earliest writing efforts took place on a plastic, toy typewriter, and resulted in several "books" (most between 10 and 30 pages long) and even a few magazines.

By the age of thirteen, he had begun winning local writing awards and became a regular in his high school's literary magazine. In college, he garnered acclaim from his English professors and fellow students while maturing and honing his skills.

It was his own website creation Infuze, that led to becoming a published author. One of his more "high concept" ideas for Infuze was to return to his love for storytelling and create a serialized tale that would play out every two weeks, telling a complete, compelling story over the course of nine months. That serialized story eventually came to the attention of several publishers, who saw it as a potential debut novel for Robin Parrish.

In 2005, Bethany House Publishers brought Parrish full circle by contracting him for the rights to not only that first book—but two sequels. A trilogy, to unfold in the consecutive summers of 2006, 2007, and 2008. One massive tale—of which that first, original story would form only the foundational first volume of the three—spread across three books.

Books
As a novelist, Parrish is the author of Bethany House Publisher's Dominion Trilogy. The first entry, Relentless, was released on [July 1], [2006]. Book 2, Fearless, on  [July 1], [2007], with Book 3, Merciless, was released in July 2008. His next novel is said to be a straightforward science fiction tale set on Earth in the near future. Tentatively titled Offworld, the novel will be a standalone book, not part of any series. His book after Offworld was a horror book based in the field of paranormal hunting, titled "Nightmare", also a standalone book. Parrish plans no further trilogies or series for the foreseeable future, but is currently contracted for at least three new novels from 2009 to 2011. As of 2012, he will have an exclusive short story in a short story omnibus by Christian author James Andrew Wilson, the collection is called 7 Hours.

Dominion Trilogy
Relentless (2006)
Fearless (2007)
Merciless (2008)

Other Books
Offworld (2009)
Nightmare (2010)
Vigilante (2011)
The Last Night of Alton Weber (2012)

Corridor Trilogy
Corridor (December 2011)
The Secret Door (2013) 

The 'Naturals
Season One: Awakening (Episodes 1–4) (with Melody Carlson, Aaron Patterson, and K.C. Neal, October 2012)
Season One: Awakening (Episodes 5–8) (with Melody Carlson, Aaron Patterson, and K.C. Neal, November 2012)
Season One: Awakening (Episodes 9–12) (with Melody Carlson, Aaron Patterson, and K.C. Neal, November 2012)
Season One: Awakening (Episodes 13–16) (with Melody Carlson, Aaron Patterson, and K.C. Neal, December 2012)
Season One: Awakening (Episodes 17–20) (with Melody Carlson, Aaron Patterson, and K.C. Neal, January 2013)

References

External links
 Official Site
 Facebook
 Twitter

1975 births
American male journalists
Living people
People from Thomasville, North Carolina
American male novelists
21st-century American novelists
Novelists from North Carolina
21st-century American male writers
21st-century American non-fiction writers